Michael Paraskos, FHEA, FRSA (born 1969) is a novelist, lecturer and writer on art. He has written several non-fiction and fiction books and essays, and articles on art, literature, culture and politics for various publications, including Art Review, The Epoch Times and The Spectator magazine. In the past he has reviewed art exhibitions for BBC radio, curated exhibitions, and taught in universities and colleges in Britain and elsewhere. He has a particular focus on modern art, having published books on the art theorist Herbert Read, and he is also known for his theories connecting anarchism and modern art. He lives in West Norwood in south London.

Education and employment
Paraskos was born in Leeds, Yorkshire, the youngest of five children, to his Cypriot father, Stass Paraskos, and English mother, Winifred Mary Pepper. As a child his family moved to Kent, where Paraskos attended a secondary modern school in Canterbury Paraskos claimed in The Guardian newspaper that those who attend secondary modern schools "are condemned to a lifetime of social exclusion and crippling self-doubt". 

After leaving school at the age of 16 Paraskos became an apprentice butcher at a Keymarkets supermarket. After becoming a vegetarian, he left butchery and enrolled on evening classes at Canterbury College of Technology to study for university entrance examinations. After this he went on to attend the University of Leeds and University of Nottingham, studying at Leeds under the novelist Rebecca Stott, and at Nottingham with the art historian Fintan Cullen. At Nottingham University he gained his doctorate in 2015 on the aesthetic theories of the anarchist poet and art theorist Herbert Read. 

After teaching as a visiting part-time lecturer at various colleges and universities, and for the WEA from 1992 onwards, Paraskos was made head of Art History for Fine Art at the University of Hull from 1994 to 2000. In 2000 he went to work in Cyprus as Director of the Cornaro Art Institute in Larnaca, Cyprus, also teaching in Cyprus at the Cyprus College of Art.

After returning to Britain 2014, he worked at SOAS, University of London until 2017, whilst also working as a lecturer at the City and Guilds of London Art School. As well as still teaching at the City and Guilds of London Art School, he is now a Senior Teaching Fellow and head of adult education at Imperial College London.

As a freelance reviewer of books and exhibitions, he has worked for The Spectator magazine, and the London edition of the Epoch Times newspaper. He has also reviewed art exhibitions for BBC Radio's Front Row programme, and SVT Television in Sweden, and appeared on Tariq Ali's political and cultural magazine programme, Rear Window, produced for TeleSur Television, as well as on various radio programmes for the Cyprus Broadcasting Corporation.

As a writer he has published fiction and non-fiction extensively. His first fiction work, a novel entitled In Search of Sixpence, was published in 2016. and his second, a satire on the Donald Trump presidency and Brexit, entitled Rabbitman, was published in 2017.

Anarchist art theory
Although he has never formally declared himself to be an anarchist, preferring instead the term syndicalist or co-operator Paraskos's work has intellectual connections to anarchist ideas, and he has personal connections with anarchist circles.

In 2006 Paraskos wrote an article for the Cypriot art newspaper ArtCyprus entitled 'Portrait of the Artist as a Terrorist' in which he used the theories of Francesco de Sanctis to argue that art creates new realities by destroying old ones. Although de Sanctis was not an anarchist, in Paraskos this statement, equating the creation of a new reality through the artistic destruction of an old one, seems to have sparked a particular interest in the relationship between anarchism and art. This was further developed in 2007 when Paraskos published an essay on his father, the artist Stass Paraskos and the painter Stelios Votsis, in which he argued that their series of collaborative paintings, begun when both artists had reached their 70s, represented a kind of "anarchist commune" on the canvas. Notably Paraskos ended this essay, written in Greek and English, with the slogan "Ζήτω η αναρχική επανάσταση!", or "Long live the anarchist revolution!"

Fiction and non-fiction books
Michael Paraskos is the author of a number of non-fiction books on art. These include Herbert Read: Art and Idealism (2014) in which he explores the ideas of the British anarchist art theorist Herbert Read and Four Essays on Art and Anarchism (2015), a collection of four lectures turned into essays. He has also written monographs on the British artists Steve Whitehead (2007) and Clive Head (2010). He has edited books by and on Herbert Read and other subjects, and is the author of one work of fiction, In Search of Sixpence (2016). This book is a semi-fictionlised account of the life and death of Paraskos's father, Stass Paraskos, who died in 2014, but it is combined with a Chandleresque detective story and other elements. Real life figures are also woven into the book, including Ezra Pound and Mariella Frostrup. These elements, which undermine the division between fiction and non-fiction writing, form what Paraskos has described as a kind of disruptive anarchist literature, although the subject matter of the book is not overtly concerned with political anarchism.

A feature of both Paraskos's fiction and non-fiction writing is the place of the author in the writing. This is clear in the personal elements of his novel, In Search of Sixpence, where Paraskos is a character in his own novel, but in his non-fiction writings on Herbert Read, Steve Whitehead and Clive Head Paraskos also frequently refers to himself and uses personal anecdotes that have the effect of personalising the texts and rooting them in Paraskos's own experiences. His second novel, a satirical fiction based on an imagined Donald Trump-like president, who also happens to be a rabbit, entitled Rabbitman, was published in 2017.

Cocktails
In 2015, responding to a call by the government-run Cyprus Tourism Organisation for ideas to promote Cypriot food and drinks to foreign visitors to Cyprus, Paraskos suggested a new cocktail using only Cypriot ingredients, called the ouzini. This was picked up by local media, and promoted by the Cyprus Tourism Organisation. Following a suggestion by the Cypriot journalist Lucy Robson that the problem for the ouzini was that it lacked a compelling story, Paraskos included the ouzini in his 2016 novel In Search of Sixpence.

Lists of publications

Books by Michael Paraskos 
 The Anarchists/Οι Αναρχικοί (Nicosia: Εν Τύποις, Βουλα Κοκκινου Λτδ, 2007)
 Steve Whitehead (London: Orage Press, 2007)
 Re-Reading Read: New Views on Herbert Read [editor] (London: Freedom Press, 2007)
 The Aphorisms of Irsee [with Clive Head]) (London: Orage Press, 2008)
 The Table Top Schools of Art (London: Orage Press, 2008)
 Is Your Artwork Really Necessary? (London: Orage Press, 2008)
 Clive Head (London: Lund Humphries, 2010)
 Regeneration (London: Orage Press, 2010)
 Herbert Read: Art and Idealism (London: Orage Press, 2014)
 Four Essays on Art and Anarchism (London: Orage Press, 2015)
 In Search of Sixpence (London: Friction Fiction, 2016) 
 Rabbitman (London: Friction Fiction, 2017)

Books including chapters by Michael Paraskos 
 New introduction to Herbert Read, To Hell with Culture (London, Routledge 2002)
 'Herbert Read' in Chris Murray (ed.), Key Thinkers on Art (London, Routledge, 2002)
 New introduction to Herbert Read, Naked Warriors (London, Imperial War Museum Publications, 2003)
 Various entries for Antonia Bostrom (ed.), The Encyclopaedia of Sculpture (London, Routledge, 2003)
 "The Prick of Conscience Leatherette Sofa", in Pippa Hale (ed.), Pipa Hale at the Patrick Studios, Leeds (Leeds: ESA, 2005)
 "The Curse of King Bomba: Or How Marxism Stole Modernism", in Hana Babayradova and Jiri Havilcek (eds.), Spiritualita (Brno: Masaryk University Press, 2006)
 "Herbert Read and Ford Madox Ford", in Paul Skinner (ed.) International Ford Madox Ford Studies vol. 6 (Amsterdam: Rodopi, 2007)
 "ME THN EYKAIPIA", in Ludmila Fidlerova and Barbora Svatkova (eds.), Mimochodem (By the Way), (Brno: Masaryk University Press, 2009)
 Various entries in Ingrid Roscoe (ed.), The Biographical Dictionary of British Sculptors 1660–1851 (New Haven, Yale University Press, 2009)
 "Bringing into being: vivifying sculpture through touch", in Peter Dent (ed.) Sculpture and Touch (Farnham: Ashgate, 2014)
 'Tea-trays and longing: Mapping Giorgione’s Sleeping Venus onto Cyprus' in Michael Paraskos (ed) Othello's Island (Mitcham: Orage Press, 2019)

Reviews and discussion of work by Michael Paraskos 
 James Ker-Lindsay, Hubert Faustmann, The Government and Politics of Cyprus (New York: Peter Lang, 2008) p. 40, n.19
 Carissa Honeywell, A British Anarchist Tradition: Herbert Read, Alex Comfort and Colin Ward (London: Continuum Publishing, 2011) p. 49f
 David Goodway, Anarchist Seeds Beneath the Snow (London: PM Press, 2012) p. 350f
 Pierluigi Sacco, review of Is Your Artwork Really Necessary? in Flash Art (Italian art magazine), no. 303, June 2012
 Jordi Costa, "La ficción en tiempos de inmediatez", in El Pais (Spanish newspaper), 28 August 2017

References

External links
 Michael Paraskos's website
 Michael Paraskos at Imperial College London

Interviews with Michael Paraskos
 "A Minute with Michael Paraskos", in The Cyprus Mail (Cyprus newspaper), 7 September 2016
 "In Search of Art. After Nyne Meets Dr Michael Paraskos" in After Nyne (UK magazine), 17 August 2016
 Theo Panayides, "Sensitive, creative, heart on sleeve", in The Cyprus Mail (Cyprus newspaper), 8 April 2016
 Interview with Michael Paraskos, "A very personal journey", in The Cyprus Weekly (Cyprus newspaper), 21 November, 2015

1969 births
Living people
Anarcho-syndicalists
British art historians
21st-century British novelists
Writers from Leeds
Cypriot novelists
Greek Cypriot writers
British male novelists
Fellows of the Higher Education Academy
People from Kent
English people of Greek Cypriot descent